Shimon Slavin, M.D., is an Israeli professor of medicine. Slavin pioneered the use of immunotherapy mediated by allogeneic donor lymphocytes and innovative methods for stem cell transplantation for the cure of hematological malignancies and solid tumors, and using hematopoietic stem cells for induction of transplantation tolerance to bone marrow and donor allografts.

More recently, he's been working on the use of multi-potent mesenchymal stem cells (MSCs) in regenerative medicine for the treatment of neurological, systemic and orthopedic disorders.

He is currently serving as the medical and scientific director of Biotherapy International Center for Innovative Cancer Immunotherapy & Cellular Medicine in Tel Aviv, Israel and as the medical director at Superinfection, a biotechnology company in Budapest, Hungary. Professor Slavin opened a tumor bank in 2020, in order to boost the development of customized immunotherapy treatments against cancer.

Education and clinical work 
Slavin graduated from the School of Medicine at the Hebrew University of Jerusalem and was awarded his medical degree in 1967. He served as the doctor of the Frogman Unit in the Israeli Navy until 1970. He was trained at the Department of Internal Medicine of the Hebrew University of Jerusalem between 1970 and 1975.

In 1975-1978, Slavin trained in clinical immunology/rheumatology at the Division of Immunology, Stanford University School of Medicine and later on in 1978 trained in clinical bone marrow transplantation under the late E.D. Thomas at the Fred Hutchinson Cancer Research Center in Seattle, Washington.

Upon returning to Jerusalem, he opened the first Bone Marrow Transplantation Center at the Hadassah University Hospital, that was later recognized as Israel's National Bone Marrow Transplantation and & Cancer Immunotherapy Center.

Clinical accomplishments 

In early 1987 Slavin introduced the concept of cancer immunotherapy using donor lymphocytes infusion (DLI) for the treatment and prevention of recurrent disease and pioneered the use of adoptive allogeneic cell-mediated immunotherapy and cytokine activated lymphocytes for both treatment and prevention of relapse following allogeneic and autologous stem cell transplantation for hematologic malignancies and solid tumors.

These observations that confirmed the therapeutic benefits of cell therapy lead to development of new concepts for the treatment of hematologic malignancies and solid tumors focusing on utilizing well-tolerated non-myeloablative stem cell transplantation as a platform for cell therapy of cancer targeting killer cells against chemotherapy-resistant malignant cells. Using procedures developed by Slavin and his team, treatment of cancer is based on smart rather than aggressive treatment with conventional chemotherapy, which is associated with immediate and late procedure-related toxicity and mortality, aiming at selective elimination of all malignant cells including cancer stem cells.

As a rule, treatment of cancer focuses on a two-step approach: tumor debulking by conventional and innovative modalities, followed by immunotherapy of minimal residual disease. As such, innovative reduced intensity conditioning (RIC) or non-myeloablative stem cell transplantation (NST) were pioneered by Slavin for safer stem cell transplantation for treatment of malignant and life-threatening non-malignant disorders correctable by using stem cells and post-transplant immunotherapy if indicated for all patients in need. The use of RIC or NST made it possible to apply much safer curative stem cell transplantation for every patient in need with no lower or upper age restriction, including also patients with less than optimal clinical condition that would not be eligible for the standard myeloablative stem cell transplantation.

Baxter International recognized the potential of cell therapy and signed an agreement which resulted in major investment with Slavin at Hadassah Medical Center for further development of new approaches based on cell therapy for the treatment of cancer, autoimmune diseases and organ transplantation based on new approaches for regulation rather than non-specific suppression of the immune system. Accordingly, Slavin's research center was established by Baxter International based in Chicago, USA and also supported by the Danny Cunniff Leukemia Research Center. Slavin was founder and director of this research center in 1994–2007.

Slavin with his team using a vector provided by the San Raffaele Hospital in Milan pioneered the first successful use of gene therapy for treatment of bubble baby born with adenosine deaminase deficiency in 2002 and the treated infant has since then been off any treatment with no evidence of disease for more than 16 years. The same procedure was used by the team in Milan for successful treatment of many additional patients and all were cured by successful gene therapy.

More recently, Slavin introduced the use of personalized anti-cancer immunotherapy focusing on the use of activated donor lymphocytes targeted against cancer with monoclonal and bispecific antibodies for efficient elimination of cancer in parallel with induction of long-lasting anti-cancer immunity for prevention of recurrent disease. The use of innovative cell-mediated immunotherapy is now applied in other centers for treatment of otherwise resistant cancer, such as in patients with triple negative breast cancer.

In parallel with the growing activities of Slavin's center and his international impact in cell therapy, new approaches were developed for induction of transplantation tolerance of host-vs-graft and graft-vs-host towards developing improved methods for allogeneic blood or marrow transplantation as well as transplantation of cellular and perfused organ allografts. Initially, Slavin pioneered the use of monoclonal antibodies anti-CD52 (Alemtuzumab, now approved by FDA as Lemtrada) for prevention of graft-vs-host disease (GVHD), the most serious complication of allogeneic stem cell transplantation, and later on for treatment of CLL and multiple sclerosis. Later, Slavin introduced the concept of post-transplant depletion of host-vs-graft and graft-vs-host reactive lymphocytes with induction of bilateral transplantation tolerance. These discoveries made it possible to extend the use of allogeneic stem cell transplantation using haploidentical donors instead of fully matched donors for safer allogeneic stem cell transplantation for every patient in need with hematological malignancies and solid tumors as well as for induction of transplantation tolerance to organ allografts. In parallel, Slavin introduced new approaches for treatment of life-threatening autoimmune diseases based on either autologous hematopoietic stem cell transplantation or more recently using multi-potent mesenchymal stem cells (MSCs) for regulation of the inflammatory anti-self reactivity in neuroinflammatory and neurodegenerative disorders focusing on multiple sclerosis.

Based on the cumulative experience using cell therapy, in recent years Slavin and his team focused also on using multi-potential bone marrow, adipose tissue or placenta & cord tissue derived MSCs for regenerative medicine, pioneering the use of MSCs for treatment of orthopedic indications including cartilage repair and new bone formation as well as for repair of renal function in addition to continuous treatment of neuroinflammatory, neurodegenerative disorders and traumatic neurological disorders.

Scientific contributions 

Slavin's basic research and clinically applied discoveries were represented in over 600 published articles and more than 900 national and international scientific presentations resulted in international impact in several different disciplines mostly related to cellular therapy for treatment of malignant and nonmalignant disorders.  Immunotherapy of cancer by donor lymphocytes made it possible to treat otherwise resistant hematological malignancies and certain metastatic solid tumors in patients with multidrug resistant cancer.

The unique efficacy of intentionally mismatched donor lymphocytes using killer cells activated prior to and following cell infusion was translated into a new paradigm for cellular therapy of cancer based on the use of transient circulation of non-engrafting donor lymphocytes targeted against minimal residual disease as a new approach for potential cure of cancer at an early stage of the disease.

Introducing NST and RIC made it possible to provide curative stem cell transplantation for a large number of patients in need with no lower or upper age group including patient's in poor performance status but would not be otherwise candidates for conventional myeloablative allogeneic stem cell transplantation. Using NST and RIC provided a safe approach for transplantation of patient's particularly sensitive to conventional cytoreductive conditioning including older patients, patients with Fanconi's anemia and chronic granulomatous disease.

Later on, introducing the concept of post-transplant deletion of alloreactive lymphocytes by cyclophosphamide by Slavin's team made it possible to provide a relatively safe and non-expensive transplant procedure for patients with no matched donor available using haploidentical family member.

The same principle was applied by Slavin for successful induction of transplantation tolerance to organ allografts pioneered successfully for the first recipient of kidney allograft alive and well >10 years out.   Observations by Slavin's team indicating that re-induction of self-tolerance could be induced by lymphoablative treatment followed by autologous stem cell transplantation provided the rationale for use of a similar approach for successful treatment of patients with life-threatening autoimmune disorders including multiple sclerosis and systemic lupus erythematosus.

In 1977 Slavin discovered the first animal model of B-cell leukemia/lymphoma (BCL1) which provided an opportunity to better understand the biology of B cells and to develop new therapeutic strategies based on the preclinical animal model.

Together with Dr. Herman Waldmann, Slavin was the first to introduce the use of an anti-CD52 monoclonal antibody (CAMPATH-1; Alemtuzumab and currently Lemtrada) that was initially used by Slavin for prevention of graft-versus-host disease (GVHD) and subsequently by others for prevention and treatment of allograft rejection and subsequently approved by FDA for treatment of multiple sclerosis.

Slavin's initial success applying bone marrow-derived mesenchymal stem cells (MSCs) for treatment of neuroinflammatory and neurodegenerative disorders together with Professor Karussis provided the rationale for using in vitro differentiated MSCs and possibly for future application of secretory products of MSCs, extracellular vesicles and exosomes.

Bibliography
Slavin authored more than 600 scientific publications. He serves on many editorial boards and national and international advisory boards. He received many international awards for excellence in recognition of his excellence in basic science and clinical medicine.

Shimon Slavin also athored four books:

Personal life 
Shimon Slavin born in Tel Aviv in 1941, but lived in Jerusalem between 1946 and 2007. Slavin is married with 3 children. Slavin hobbies include music and painting, swimming & diving, tennis and bicycling.

References 

1941 births
Israeli immunologists
Stanford University School of Medicine alumni
The Hebrew University-Hadassah Medical School alumni
Living people
People from Tel Aviv